This article is the Electoral history of Louis St. Laurent, the twelfth Prime Minister of Canada (1948-1957).

A Liberal, he served one term as Prime Minister (1948–1957), succeeding William Lyon Mackenzie King.  He won two general elections (1948, 1953) and lost one (1957).  John Diefenbaker succeeded him as prime minister, while Lester Pearson became the leader of the Liberal Party.

He stood for election to the House of Commons of Canada five times, all successfully.

Summary 

St. Laurent ranks ninth out of twenty-three prime ministers for time in office, serving one term of eight years and 218 days.

St. Laurent was the third of eight prime ministers from Quebec, the others being Sir John Abbott, Sir Wilfrid Laurier, Pierre Trudeau, Brian Mulroney, Jean Chrétien, Paul Martin and Justin Trudeau.  He was also the second of five francophone prime ministers, the others being Laurier, Pierre Trudeau, Chrétien, and Justin Trudeau.

A late-comer to politics, St. Laurent was a well-respected lawyer when Prime Minister Mackenzie King recruited him to the federal government, to replace Ernest Lapointe, King's long-time Quebec lieutenant, who had died suddenly.  St. Laurent served in King's government as Minister of Justice and Minister of External Affairs, as well as King's political Quebec lieutenant.  When King retired after his lengthy time in office, he supported St. Laurent for the leadership of the Liberal Party.  St. Laurent won on the first ballot and automatically became prime minister.

St. Laurent led the Liberal Party in two general elections in 1949 and 1953, winning majority governments each time.  However, in his third general election, the major issue was the building of a trans-Canada gas pipeline, with financing from the federal government.  The financing proposal triggered a controversial debate in the House of Commons, which St. Laurent's government ended by the use of closure to push the measure through the Commons.  St. Laurent and the Liberals were defeated in the general election of 1957, with John Diefenbaker forming a minority government.  St. Laurent stayed on as Liberal leader and Leader of the Opposition for half a year after the election.  He resigned as Liberal leader early in 1958 and retired from politics.  He was succeeded as Liberal leader by Lester B. Pearson.

St. Laurent stood for election to the Canadian House of Commons five times, all for the riding of Quebec East.  He was elected each time (1942 (by-election), 1945, 1949, 1953 and 1957).  He served in the Commons for a total of 16 years, 1 month, 20 days.

Federal general elections, 1949 to 1957 

St. Laurent led the Liberal Party in three general elections, winning two majority governments and losing once.

Federal election, 1949 

St. Laurent won a decisive victory in the 1949 election.  George Drew, the leader of the Progressive Conservative Party of Canada, continued as Leader of the Opposition.

1 Prime Minister when election was called;  Prime Minister after election.
2 Leader of the Opposition when election was called;  Leader of the Opposition after the election.
3 Table does not include parties which received votes but did not elect any members.

Federal election, 1953 

St. Laurent won a second victory in the 1953 election, though with a reduced majority.  George Drew, the leader of the Progressive Conservative Party of Canada, continued as Leader of the Opposition.

1 Prime Minister when election was called;  Prime Minister after election.
2 Leader of the Opposition when election was called;  Leader of the Opposition after the election.
3 Table does not include parties which received votes but did not elect any members.

Federal election, 1957 

St. Laurent went to the polls a third time in 1957, but the election resulted in a hung parliament, with no party having a majority.  Although the Liberals came in first in the popular vote, they came in second in seats in the House of Commons, behind John Diefenbaker and the Progressive Conservatives.  St. Laurent resigned and  Diefenbaker formed a minority government.  St. Laurent became Leader of the Opposition, but resigned as Liberal leader in early 1958 and retired from politics.

1 Leader of the Opposition when election was called;  Prime Minister after election.
2 Prime Minister when election was called;  Leader of the Opposition after the election.
3 Table does not include parties which received votes but did not elect any members.

Federal constituency elections, 1942 to 1957 

|Canadian Party
|Paul Bouchard
|align=right|12,768

Liberal Party leadership convention, 1948 

St. Laurent entered the convention as the favourite, with King's support in opposition to James Gardiner, the long-time Minister of Agriculture from Saskatchewan.  St. Laurent won on the first ballot, after most other nominees dropped out as a result of King's manoeuvering behind the scenes.

 Nominated, but withdrew on the floor of the convention prior to the first ballot.

See also 

 Electoral history of William Lyon Mackenzie King - St. Laurent's predecessor as leader of the Liberal Party and as Prime Minister.
 Electoral history of John Diefenbaker - St. Laurent's successor as Prime Minister.
 Electoral history of Lester B. Pearson - St. Laurent's successor as leader of the Liberal Party.

References

External links 

 Library of Parliament:  History of Federal Ridings Since 1867
 CPAC - 1948 Liberal Convention

St. Laurent, Louis